Sabu and the Magic Ring is a 1957 American adventure film directed by George Blair and starring Sabu, William Marshall, Daria Massey, John Doucette, Peter Mamakos and Vladimir Sokoloff. The film's sets were designed by the art director Dave Milton. It was originally conceived as a television series, but the project failed to gain a buyer and instead it was released as a feature film. It was produced and distributed by Allied Artists and was in the tradition of Arabian Nights films.

Synopsis
Sabu a stable boy in the Caliph's palace in Samarkand discovers an old ring that grants magic wishes. In turn he tries to thwart a plot to overthrow and kill the Caliph.

Cast
 Sabu as Sabu
 William Marshall as the Genie
 John Doucette as Kemal
 Peter Mamakos as Muzafar
 Vladimir Sokoloff as Fakir
 Daria Massey as Zumeela
 Robert Shafto as Caliph
 Bernard Rich as Ali
 Robin Morse as Yunan
 George Khoury as Phransigar
 Cyril Delevanti as Abdul
 Kenneth Terrell as Wazir's Guard (uncredited)

References

Bibliography
 Craig, Rob. It Came from 1957: A Critical Guide to the Year's Science Fiction, Fantasy and Horror Films. McFarland, 2013.
 Von Gunden, Kenneth. Flights of Fancy: The Great Fantasy Films. McFarland, 2001.

External links
 

1957 films
1957 adventure films
American adventure films
Films directed by George Blair
Allied Artists films
Films set in Samarkand
1950s English-language films
1950s American films